Daniel Lee Hovland (born November 10, 1954) is a senior United States district judge of the United States District Court for the District of North Dakota.

Education and career

Born in Moorhead, Minnesota, Hovland received a Bachelor of Arts degree from Concordia College in 1976 and a Juris Doctor from the University of North Dakota School of Law in 1979. He was a law clerk to Judge Ralph J. Erickstad of the North Dakota Supreme Court from 1979 to 1980. He was an Assistant attorney general of Office of the Attorney General for the State of North Dakota from 1980 to 1983. He was in private practice in Bismarck, North Dakota, from 1983 to 2002. He was a Commissioner, Bismarck Park & Recreation District, North Dakota from 1992 to 2002. He was an Administrative law judge, Office of Administrative Hearings, North Dakota from 1994 to 2002.

District court service

Hovland was nominated by President George W. Bush on June 26, 2002, to a seat vacated by Patrick Anthony Conmy. He was confirmed by the United States Senate on November 14, 2002, and received his commission on November 26, 2002. He served as chief judge from 2002 through 2009 and reassumed that role on November 1, 2016, until assuming Senior status on November 10, 2019.

References

External links

1954 births
Living people
Judges of the United States District Court for the District of North Dakota
United States district court judges appointed by George W. Bush
21st-century American judges
People from Moorhead, Minnesota
Concordia College (Moorhead, Minnesota) alumni
University of North Dakota alumni
North Dakota state court judges